ISO 3166-2:HU is the entry for Hungary in ISO 3166-2, part of the ISO 3166 standard published by the International Organization for Standardization (ISO), which defines codes for the names of the principal subdivisions (e.g., provinces or states) of all countries coded in ISO 3166-1.

Currently for Hungary, ISO 3166-2 codes are defined for 1 capital city, 19 counties, and 23 cities with county rights. The capital of the country Budapest has special status equal to the counties, while the cities with county rights, often called urban counties, have extended powers but are technically not independent of the counties.

Each code consists of two parts, separated by a hyphen. The second part is two letters.

Current codes
Subdivision names are listed as in the ISO 3166-2 standard published by the ISO 3166 Maintenance Agency (ISO 3166/MA).

Click on the button in the header to sort each column.

Changes
The following changes to the entry have been announced by the ISO 3166/MA since the first publication of ISO 3166-2 in 1998:

See also
 Subdivisions of Hungary
 FIPS region codes of Hungary
 NUTS codes of Hungary

External links
 ISO Online Browsing Platform: HU
 Counties of Hungary, Statoids.com

2:HU
ISO 3166-2
Hungary geography-related lists